Undercover Kitty may refer to:
Undercover Kitty (film), a 2001 Dutch film
Fred the Undercover Kitty, a cat that worked for New York Police Department